Rodulfo Manzo Audante (born June 5, 1949 in Cañete) is a retired professional football defender from Peru. He competed for the Peru national football team at the 1978 FIFA World Cup, and obtained a total number of 22 caps for his native country in the years 1972 to 1978. He played club football for Deportivo Municipal. He is also the father of Ytalo Manzo.

References

External links

See also
1978 FIFA World Cup squads

1949 births
Living people
People from Lima Region
Association football defenders
Peruvian footballers
Deportivo Municipal footballers
Club Atlético Vélez Sarsfield footballers
C.S. Emelec footballers
Deportivo Táchira F.C. players
Atlético Torino footballers
Peru international footballers
1978 FIFA World Cup players
Peruvian expatriate footballers
Expatriate footballers in Argentina
Expatriate footballers in Ecuador
Expatriate footballers in Venezuela